Fiji have competed in five editions of the Rugby League World Cup. Their best finish is the semi-finals, which they've made in the past three consecutive tournaments.

Tournament history

Tournaments

1995

2000

2008

2013

2017

2021

References

External links 

Fiji national rugby league team
Rugby League World Cup